The Cincinnati History Museum  is an urban history museum in Cincinnati, Ohio, United States. It opened in 1990 at the  Cincinnati Museum Center at Union Terminal.

The museum features the recreated Cincinnati Public Landing from the mid 1860s and an exhibit covering Cincinnati's role in World War II. Cincinnati In Motion is a scale model representation of Downtown Cincinnati in the 1940s featuring working streetcars.

Galleries
The Cincinnati History Museum included 6 main galleries until its temporary closure in 2016:
 Cincinnati In Motion
 Cincinnati Goes to War
 Early Settlement
 Flatboat Gallery
 Public Landing
 Machine Tools

References

External links

History museums in Ohio
History of Cincinnati
Museums established in 1990
Museums in Cincinnati
1990 establishments in Ohio
City museums in the United States
Cincinnati Union Terminal